Dracophyllum cockayneanum is a species of plant in the family Ericaceae that is endemic to the Auckland and Campbell islands off the coast of New Zealand.

References

cockayneanum
Endemic flora of New Zealand